Plastic pants (also known as Waterproof Pants, Plastic Panties, Diaper Dover's, Nappy Covers, Dry Joggers, Nappy Wraps, Wraps, or Pilchers) are devices worn over a diaper with the purpose of containing liquid or solid waste that could leak through the fabric. They are waterproof with a plastic feel, rather than the soft napkin feel. Today, plastic pants are usually made out of polyvinyl chloride (PVC) or polyurethane (PU). 

The availability of inexpensive, and easily manufactured, man-made waterproof materials since the 1950s has significantly improved the quality of life of those with continence problems.

History
At the turn of the 20th century, oiled silk was used as a waterproofing medium in adult clothing. This ended when latex rubber became widely available in the 1920s, when the idea of wearing protective garments became popular. Ladies' panties were worn with a waterproof latex crotch insert or a waterproof panel in the back of an underskirt, to make coping with heavy menstruation cycles easier and socially safer. The original diaper covers were made from oiled wool, which is naturally waterproof. Newly available latex pants for covering diapers reduced the difficulties in caring for young children on long journeys, on special social occasions, and overnight.

During the 1950s, plastics, mainly PVC, replaced latex on account of their lower cost, ease of maintenance, and lack of noise when handled. However, the history of these garments has influenced their modern names: “Rubber pants” and “Rubbers” are used commonly to mean waterproof pants of all kinds, even though they are typically now made of plastic rather than latex.

The invention of superabsorbent polymers (for diapers and incontinence pads), and blood-gelling polymers (for sanitary pads) largely displaced traditional cloth diapers and pads. Not only were these modern absorbent materials lighter and less bulky, but they became available as an “all-in-one” solution with their own integral waterproof plastic backing. This eliminated the need for separate waterproof underwear in many situations. Nevertheless, waterproof pants are still used as a second line of defense where absolute protection from leakage is crucial.

Effectiveness
The development of plastic pants contributed significantly to juvenile fashion. Until the late 1950s, infants of both sexes usually wore short dresses until they were ready for toilet training thus avoiding the risks to clothing and hygiene of having top clothes in prolonged close contact with a damp or soiled diaper. Effective and easily obtainable waterproofing – whether integral with the pad or as separate pants – safely allowed a child to be dressed in trousers. The development of disposable diapers made the fit of clothing even neater as the new diapers were less bulky than the cloth ones.

See also

 Rubber pants
 Cloth diaper

References

Undergarments